Zobellella denitrificans is a Gram-negative, facultatively anaerobic, heterotrophic and denitrifying bacterium from the genus of Zobellella which has been isolated from sediments from a mangrove ecosystems from Miaoli County in Taiwan.

References 

Aeromonadales
Bacteria described in 2006